Gaerky Creek is a stream in the U.S. state of Oregon. It is a tributary to Bear Creek.

Gaerky Creek received its name in 1854, and the stream's name possibly is a corruption of the last name of one William Gerke.

References

Rivers of Oregon
Rivers of Jackson County, Oregon